Market and Gough is a light rail station in San Francisco, California, serving the San Francisco Municipal Railway F Market & Wharves heritage railway line. It is located on Market Street at the intersections of Haight Street and Gough Street.

Under the proposed Western Variant of the planned Better Market Street project, the inbound stop would be moved across the intersection.

References 

San Francisco Municipal Railway streetcar stations